PRPL may refer to:

Park Ridge Public Library, a public library in Park Ridge, Illinois, United States
Pasir Ris Public Library, a public library in Pasir Ris, Singapore